Paul Francis Cantwell (September 15, 1927 – June 30, 1997) was an American politician, active in Indianapolis, who served as a Democratic member of the Indiana House of Representatives.

Early life
Cantwell was born September 15, 1927. Cantwell's mother was active in Indianapolis politics. Cantwell began working in politics as a political volunteer at the age of fifteen. He served in the United States Navy during World War II. He took classes at Indiana University–Purdue University Indianapolis, University of Indianapolis, and Butler University.

Career
Cantwell began his career as a masonry contractor and became an advocate for trade unions.

In 1965, he was hired to work as an administrative assistant for Congressman Andrew Jacobs Jr. in Washington, D.C.

Beginning in 1966, Cantwell served as a Marion County commissioner. During part of his tenure as a commissioner, he was the president of the Marion County Board of Commissioners. During part of his tenure on the board, he also served on the Metropolitan Thoroughfare Commission and as president of the Marion County Drainage Board. Cantwell was a vocal supporter of James W. Beatty's  Democratic primary challenge to incumbent Indianapolis mayor John J. Barton in the 1967 Indianapolis mayoral election. Cantwell was standing with Robert F. Kennedy when he gave his 1968 speech on the assassination of Martin Luther King Jr.

Cantwell began serving on the Indianapolis City-County Council after the city-county consolidation that established the Unigov in 1970. During part of his time in this body, he served as the minority leader.

In 1975, Cantwell was one of the plaintiffs in a lawsuit arguing that the legislation creating Unigov denied certain voters the equal protection guaranteed in the Fourteenth Amendment to the United States Constitution. The lawsuit, in part, argued that this right was violated by the fact that the Unigov legislation allowed four city-county councilmen elected at-large from the entire Unigov to sit on councils for special police and fire department districts which only served part of the Unigov area. The lawsuit sought to have the four at-large council members barred from these boards, which would have had the consequence, with the composition of the council in 1975, of giving Democrats control of these boards. The lawsuit was unsuccessful, with the plaintiffs losing the case in the United States Court of Appeals for the Seventh Circuit.

Cantwell resigned from the city council to focus on his campaign as the Democratic nominee in the 1979 Indianapolis mayoral election. Cantwell lost to incumbent Republican William H. Hudnut III in what was reported to have been the greatest margin of defeat for a Democratic candidate in an Indianapolis mayoral election in 150 years. During the campaign, Cantwell struggled to raise funds, while Hadnut was able to spend a considerable amount on his own campaign. Additionally at the time of the election, Cantwell's son Danny was awaiting trial for murder. Cantwell argued that the charges were political, and were retribution for his investigations of police corruption.

In 1992, Cantwell was elected to the Indiana House of Representatives district 97. He defeated Robert L. Murley in the Democratic primary, capturing more than 70% of the vote. He won the general election by a narrow 250-vote margin over Republican nominee Irene Heffley. On the same night he won this election, his daughter Maria, by then already a member of the Washington House of Representatives, won election to the United States House of Representatives.

Cantwell was an opponent of the construction of the Victory Field baseball stadium in Indianapolis, strongly preferring to see the continued use of the existing Bush Stadium.

In 1994, Cantwell lost reelection to Irene Heffley by 4,782 votes to 4,037 votes amid the year of the "Republican Revolution".

Personal life 
In 1997, Cantwell died of laryngeal cancer at the age of 69.

References

1997 deaths
1927 births
Democratic Party members of the Indiana House of Representatives
Indianapolis City-County Council members
Deaths from lung cancer
20th-century American politicians